Opomyza is a genus of acalyptrate flies.

Species
Opomyza aisae   Carles-Tolrá, 1993
Opomyza athamus (Séguy, 1928)
Opomyza decora  Oldenberg, 1910
Opomyza florum (Fabricius, 1794)
Opomyza germinationis (Linnaeus, 1758)
Opomyza limbatus (Williston, 1886)
Opomyza lineatopunctata von Roser, 1840
Opomyza nigriventris  Loew, 1865
Opomyza petrei Mesnil, 1934
Opomyza punctata Haliday, 1833
Opomyza punctella Fallén, 1820
Opomyza thalhammeri  Strobl, 1900
Opomyza townsendi (Williston, 1898)

References

 Drake, C.M. 1993. A review of the British Opomyzidae. British Journal of Entomology and Natural History 6: 159-176.

External links
Biolib

Opomyzidae
Opomyzoidea genera
Agricultural pest insects
Taxa named by Carl Fredrik Fallén